Răscăieți is a commune in Ștefan Vodă District, Moldova. It is composed of two villages, Răscăieți and Răscăieții Noi.

Notable people
 

Elena Frumosu (born 1968), Moldova politician

References

Communes of Ștefan Vodă District
Populated places on the Dniester